Espen Søgård (born 10 October 1979 in Fetsund) is a Norwegian former footballer who played as a  midfielder for Lillestrøm during most of his career.

Søgård have played most of his career at Lillestrøm, but had a short spell at Start from the summer of 2011 to the summer of 2012. Before transferring to Lillestrøm in 1997 he played youth football for Fet in Norway. He has been capped 9 times for the Norwegian under-21 team, and twice by the senior national team.

After the 2012 season he stepped down from professional football and rejoined Fet.

Career statistics

References

Club bio

1979 births
Living people
People from Fet
Norwegian footballers
Norway international footballers
Lillestrøm SK players
IK Start players
Eliteserien players
Association football midfielders
Sportspeople from Viken (county)